"Stop the Rock" is a song by British electronic music group Apollo 440 from their third studio album, Gettin' High on Your Own Supply (1999). Released on 16 August 1999, it was the group's breakout single.

Composition and recording 
The song was inspired by Status Quo's "Caroline". The lead vocal was performed by Ian Hoxley, formerly of Gaye Bykers on Acid. Trevor Gray, Howard Gray, Ian Hoxley and Noko are credited as composers.

Release 
The single was released on 16 August 1999 through Stealth Sonic and distributed by Sony Music. It spent six weeks on the UK singles chart, peaking at  10.

Charts

Release history

References 

 
 
 
 

1999 songs
1999 singles
550 Music singles
Apollo 440 songs
Epic Records singles